Ian Paton may refer to:

 Ian Paton (footballer) (born 1957), Australian rules footballer
 Ian Paton (politician), Canadian politician
 Ian Paton (bishop) (born 1957), British Anglican bishop